Patrick John Tristram Lawrence, 5th Baron Trevethin and 3rd Baron Oaksey,  (born 29 June 1960) is a British barrister, hereditary peer and crossbench member of the House of Lords. He was educated at Christ Church, Oxford.

He is a barrister practising from 4 New Square Chambers and was elected to sit in the House at a crossbench hereditary peers' by-election in October 2015, following the retirement of David Montgomery, 2nd Viscount Montgomery of Alamein.

In 1987 he married Lucinda, a daughter of businessman Demetri Marchessini. They have a son and two daughters.

Arms

References

External links
 4 New Square – Barristers
 The Peerage

1960 births
Living people
British people of Welsh descent
Patrick Lawrence, 5th Baron Trevethin
People from Wiltshire
Alumni of Christ Church, Oxford
Barons in the Peerage of the United Kingdom
Crossbench hereditary peers
British barristers
English landowners
English farmers

Hereditary peers elected under the House of Lords Act 1999